Andrew Stuart may refer to:

 Andrew Stuart, 1st Baron Castle Stuart (1560–1629), Scottish nobleman, soldier and courtier
 Andrew Stuart (1725–1801), Scottish lawyer and politician, MP for Lanarkshire 1774–84, for Weymouth and Melcombe Regis 1790–1801
 Andrew Stuart (Canadian politician) (1785–1840), Canadian lawyer and politician
 Andrew Stuart (seigneur) (1812–1891), Quebec seigneur and judge
 Andrew Stuart (Ohio politician) (1823–1872), U.S. Representative from Ohio, 1853–1855
 Andrew M. Stuart (born 1962), mathematics professor at the University of Warwick

See also 
 Andrew Stewart (disambiguation)
 Andy Stewart (disambiguation)
 Stuart Andrew (born 1971), British MP for Pudsey